Douelle is a commune in the Lot department in south-western France.

It is a port on the left bank of the river Lot.

The village's history has been closely linked with the transport of local wine, as well as the manufacture of barrels. (The wooden stave of a barrel is named a Douelle).

See also
Communes of the Lot department

References

External links

 Douelle mairie website
 Douelle Mairie

Communes of Lot (department)